Mohanpur Union is a union parishad in Matlab Uttar Upazila of Chandpur District in the Division of Chittagong, Bangladesh.

Chairman
Present Chairman of the Mohanpur Union Parishad is Shamsul Haque Chowdhury Babul who is the paternal brother of ex-minister Mofazzal Hossain Chowdhury Maya . There are nine wards in the parishad.
Namely:
 Ward No: Villages
 Ward-01: Mahanpur, Komarkhola
 Ward-02: Mohammadpur
 Ward-03: Mudafar, Fatuakandi
 Ward-04: Baherchar
 Ward-05:: Charwebstar
 Ward-06: Mahadurpur
 Ward-07: Athaidi Mathabanga, Mathabanga Balurchar
 Ward-08: Kamaldi Mathabanga
 Ward-09: Pachani, Dewankandi
 Total 13 Villages in 9 wards

Notable Person
Many notable persons were born in Mohanpur Union of Matlab Uttar Upazila in Chandpur District. Some are:-
 Mofazzal Hossain Chowdhury Maya, Ex-Cabinet Minister
 Wahiduddin Ahmed, 3rd Vice Chancellor of BUET, ‍an advisor to the Caretaker government of Bangladesh in December, 1990.

References

Matlab Uttar Upazila